Berkeley Park Subdivision Historic District is a residential subdivision in Syracuse, New York. It was designed in 1911 by Clarence Congdon.  It is significant as "an outstanding and highly intact representation of early-twentieth century landscape architectural design."

The district was added to the National Register of Historic Places in 2002.

References

Syracuse Then and Now

Historic districts in Onondaga County, New York
Historic districts on the National Register of Historic Places in New York (state)
National Register of Historic Places in Syracuse, New York